Best of the Best may refer to:

 Best of the Best (1989 film), American martial arts film directed by Bob Radler
 Best of the Best (1992 film), Hong Kong action film directed by Herman Yau 
 Best of the Best (Milli Vanilli album), 1988
 Best of the Best (Westlife album), a compilation album
 Best of the Best: Championship Karate, a 1992 video game
 Best of the Best: 20 Years of the Year's Best Science Fiction, a 2005 science fiction anthology
 CZW Best of the Best, a professional wrestling tournament 
 Best of the Best: Wild and Mild, a 2013 compilation album by Gackt
 Sinatra: Best of the Best, a 2011 compilation album by Frank Sinatra
 The Best of the Best, a 1998 compilation album by Marika Gombitová

See also 
Crème de la crème (disambiguation)